Mikola Viktaravich Statkevich (born 12 August 1956) is a Belarusian politician and presidential candidate at the 2010 election. Since 31 May 2020 he is held in prison by Belarusian authorities. Viasna Human Rights Centre recognized him as a political prisoner. On 14 December 2021, Statkevich was sentenced to 14 years in prison.

Biography 
Mikola Statkevich was born in Liadna near Slutsk into a family of school teachers. He is a descendant of the Statkiewicz noble family.

Statkevich graduated from a military engineering school in Minsk and served in the Soviet antiaircraft defense in the Arctic region.

In the early 1990s, Statkevich was one of the leaders of the Belarusian Militarymen Association, a pro-independence union of Soviet officers from Belarus. In 1991 Statkevich has left the Communist Party of the USSR as a protest against a brutal Soviet military action  against the democratic pro-independence opposition in Lithuania.

In 1993 Statkevich was actively protesting against Belarus joining a collective defence treaty with Azerbaijan and Armenia that were at war at a time, to prevent Belarusian soldiers serving in military conflicts outside the country. For this Statkevich has been dismissed from the army shortly before the scheduled presentation of his Doctor of Science dissertation. He then became one of the leaders of the Belarusian Social Democratic Party (People's Assembly), including the party's chairman since 1995.

Statkevich was one of the leaders of the 1999 Freedom March against the Union State.

In 2005 Statkevich was sentenced to three years of labour for organising mass protests against the 2004 referendum in Belarus that has lifted the constitutional limit on presidential terms and allowed president Aliaksandr Lukashenka to again participate in presidential elections. Amnesty International declared Mikola Statkevich a prisoner of conscience. He was then set free in 2007 following an amnesty.

Statkevich was one of many democratic candidates who ran in the 2010 Belarusian presidential election. After a crackdown on opposition demonstrations, he was arrested and put in prison. On 26 May 2011, he was sentenced to 6 years in a medium security penal colony. Amnesty International reported in July 2012 that Statkevich had been moved to a "punishment cell" after refusing to sign a confession. He was later released from imprisonment but disappeared in early 2017 after announcing a planned demonstration in central Minsk. He was again released by authorities after they violently suppressed the rally.

On 31 May 2020, he was arrested on his way to a rally where signatures for Sviatlana Tsikhanouskaya were being gathered. He was sentenced to 15 days for participating in an unsanctioned protest. This sentence was extended two more times, and he was tried again on 29 June for organizing unrest. Viasna Human Rights Centre called the accusations politically motivated and demanded the immediate release of Statkevich.

On 14 December 2021, Statkevich was sentenced to 14 years in prison. Along with him, Ihar Losik, Sergei Tikhanovsky and three other political prisoners were also sentenced. Throughout the 565 days he has spent in detention, Statkevich was not allowed to get access to legal representation or defence and he has been denied all contact with his family.

Awards and recognitions 
In December 2020, Statkevich was named among the representatives of the Democratic Belarusian opposition, honored with the Sakharov Prize by the European Parliament.

References

External links
 Official website of Mikola Statkevich
 Official presidential candidate's biography
 Official YouTube channel of Mikola Statkevich

1956 births
Living people
Amnesty International prisoners of conscience held by Belarus
Belarusian democracy activists
Belarusian military personnel
Belarusian politicians
Belarusian prisoners and detainees
Candidates in the 2010 Belarusian presidential election
People from Slutsk District
Political prisoners according to Viasna Human Rights Centre
Soviet Army officers